Manikandapuram was the capital of the Kingdom of Thekkumkur (now part of India). Manikandapuram is a part of Vakathanam Gramam in the Changanassery Taluk of Kottayam District. At the beginning of the Thekkumkur princely state, the nearest place, Vennimala was established as the headquarters. Vennimala was the most secure place for the enemy. The forests were cut down and developed into habitable areas and the administration is strengthened by the capital city of Manikandapuram.

Manikandapuram Temple 

The Manikandapuram Sreekrishna Temple was built in the 12th century by Thekkumkur king Eravi Manikanda Varman (reign: 1150 - 1180 C.E). The construction of the temple and the installation of the idol of Lord Krishna took place on the 25th day of Malayalam month Medam (Meṣa) in Kollam Era 325 (1150 C.E). The king would take part in the annual festival of Vennimala Sree Rama Lakshmana Swamy Temple. During the royal hunting (Pallivetta) in the temple, the king Eravi Manikandan shot an animal he saw, but it was a cow. The Manikandapuram Temple was built by King Manikandan for his atonement, knowing that he killed a cow.

There is evidence that the fort and the tunnels were at Manikandapuram, as were the later headquarters of the Thekkumkur monarchy at Changanassery and Thaliyanthanapuram (Kottayam). The temple was very popular in the Thekkumkur dynasty. References to this temple are found in Aithihyamala of Kottarathil Sankunni and Unnuneeli Sandesam, the classics of Malayalam Literature.

Unnuneeli Sandesam 
The Malayalam poem Unnuneeli Sandesam describes the ancient Manikandapuram and Sreekrishna temple. In this poem, the temple and the underground passages connecting Venimala and Manikandapuram are explicit. There is depression in Manikandapuram, which looks like the entrance to a tunnel. The temple has huge acres of paddy fields in revenue records to feed hundreds of people every day.

References 

Kingdom of Thekkumkur
Changanassery
Historical Indian regions
Former capital cities in India
Culture of Kerala
History of Changanassery